Wardair Canada was a privately run Canadian airline, founded by Max Ward in 1952 under the name Wardair Ltd, before formally changing its name to "Wardair Canada" in 1976. The airline was acquired by and folded into Canadian Airlines in 1989.

History
In 1946, Maxwell W. Ward founded the Polaris Charter Company in Yellowknife, NWT. In 1952 the airline was formed as Wardair and operations began on 6 June 1953 using a single engine de Havilland Canada Otter. In 1962, it entered the trans-atlantic charter market and changed its name to Wardair Canada Ltd. On 1 January 1976, the name was changed to Wardair Canada (1975) Ltd and yet again on 10 June 1977 to Wardair International Ltd.

Wardair provided domestic service in Quebec, Manitoba, Ontario, British Columbia, and Alberta, as well as international service to Europe, the United States, and several Caribbean and South American countries. On March 31, 1989, the Canadian Transportation Agency approved the sale of Wardair to Canadian Airlines International.

Wardair had its roots in the air charter business in the Yukon and the Northwest Territories. From a modest start as Polaris Charter Company in the mid 1940s operating small bi-planes such as the De Havilland DH.83 Fox Moth. With service as a passenger and cargo charter company, the airline expanded into the more populous regions of Canada and,  from 1962 onwards, was transformed into a holiday charter airline.

Wardair was not a discount airline but an airline providing good service at lower-than-average prices.  They were known for high quality meals and friendly staff.  "Steak & Champagne" flights was a popular advertising tag line in the 1980s, and won various awards from magazines for their service (Holiday Which? magazine charter airline of the year 1985, and scheduled carrier of the years 1986 and 1987). Flight attendants served food on Wardair branded Royal Doulton china on tray-table tablecloths on the passenger tray. The seats featured generous pitch.

The operations from the early 1950s were small bush-type runs based in Edmonton, Alberta, and Yellowknife, NWT.  Wardair's first large aircraft was a four engine Douglas DC-6B propliner, leased in summer 1962, which started the airline's emphasis on charter flights — to Europe in summer and to Mexico, California, etc. in winter. In 1966, the airline began operating its first jet, a Boeing 727-100 — Canada's first Boeing 727 — used to operate flights to and from Europe with a refueling stop en route.  The Boeing trijet was followed by the first intercontinental Boeing 707 (thus allowing non-stop flights to Europe) in 1968, and the first Boeing 747 jumbo jet in 1973. Although initially centred on Edmonton, many long-haul flights were relocated to concentrate on Vancouver and Toronto as primary destinations, while Edmonton would continue to connect other major Canadian cities. Nonetheless, Edmonton continued to operate as a major transatlantic hub for Wardair, with flights to Prestwick, London Gatwick, Amsterdam Schiphol, and Frankfurt. Honolulu, Hawaii, became a significant winter destination, with London Gatwick becoming a major summertime destination with direct flights from Vancouver, Edmonton, Calgary, Winnipeg, Ottawa, and Toronto.

In 1970, the mainline fleet consisted of two 707s and one 727. By 1980, the fleet had grown to include four 747s and two intercontinental McDonnell Douglas DC-10-30 wide body jetliners. Wardair was a small but steadily growing company. In 1987, building on a fleet of seven jets, Wardair undertook a major expansion, ordering 38 jet aircraft including 14 Airbus A310s, 12 McDonnell Douglas MD-88s, and 12 Fokker 100s which represented an exponential expansion of operations that would ultimately prove to be financially unsustainable. The MD-80 and 100 jetliners were never delivered or operated by the airline.

Only the first 12 Airbus A310s had been delivered — the remaining A310s as well as all of the MD-88 and 100 deliveries were cancelled after the takeover.

The airline added scheduled passenger service to its charter service flights in 1986. Rapid expansion, problems with their computer booking system, and failure to attract business customers, who had developed customer loyalty to frequent flier programs on competing airlines, led the airline into financial difficulties, ultimately resulting in Wardair Canada being sold to Canadian Airlines (which operated as Canadian Airlines International) in 1989.

Destinations

Wardair served the following destinations at various times during its existence:

Domestic
 Abbotsford, British Columbia - Abbotsford International Airport
 Calgary, Alberta - Calgary International Airport
 Coppermine River, Nunavut (formerly in the Northwest Territories) - Coppermine Airport
 Edmonton, Alberta - Edmonton International Airport
 Montreal, Quebec - Montréal–Pierre Elliott Trudeau International Airport
 Ottawa, Ontario - Ottawa Macdonald–Cartier International Airport
 Regina, Saskatchewan - Regina International Airport
 Saskatoon, Saskatchewan - Saskatoon International Airport
 Toronto, Ontario - Toronto Pearson International Airport
 Vancouver, British Columbia - Vancouver International Airport
 Windsor, Ontario - Windsor Airport (Charters to Britain in the 1970s and early 1980s)
 Winnipeg, Manitoba - Winnipeg James Armstrong Richardson International Airport
 Yellowknife, Northwest Territories - Yellowknife Airport

International
 Amsterdam - Amsterdam Airport Schiphol
 Birmingham, England - Birmingham Airport
 Barbados - Grantley Adams International Airport
 Cardiff, Wales - Cardiff Airport
 Düsseldorf - Düsseldorf Airport
 Fort Lauderdale - Fort Lauderdale-Hollywood International Airport
 Frankfurt, Hesse - Frankfurt Airport
 Glasgow, Scotland - Glasgow Prestwick Airport
 Hamburg - Hamburg Airport
 Honolulu, Hawaii - Honolulu International Airport
 Leeds, England - Leeds Bradford Airport
 Liverpool, England - Liverpool John Lennon Airport
 London, England - Gatwick Airport
 London, England - London Stansted Airport
 Los Angeles - Los Angeles International Airport
 Manchester, England - Manchester Airport
 Miami - Miami International Airport
 Newcastle upon Tyne, England - Newcastle International Airport
 Paris - Orly Airport
 Seattle, WA - Renton Municipal Airport
 San Diego - San Diego International Airport
 San Juan - Isla Verde International Airport
 Stockholm - Stockholm-Arlanda Airport
 Tampa - Tampa International Airport

Scheduled service destinations in 1989
According to its 1989 scheduled service route map, Wardair was serving the following destinations with scheduled passenger flights:

 Amsterdam, the Netherlands
 Birmingham, England, United Kingdom
 Calgary, Alberta, Canada
 Edmonton, Alberta, Canada
 London, England, United Kingdom - Gatwick Airport 
 Manchester, England, United Kingdom
 Montreal, Quebec, Canada - Dorval Airport and Mirabel Airport
 Paris, France
 Prestwick, Scotland, United Kingdom
 Puerto Plata, Dominican Republic
 Ottawa, Ontario, Canada
 San Juan, Puerto Rico
 Toronto, Ontario, Canada
 Vancouver, British Columbia, Canada
 Winnipeg, Manitoba, Canada

Charter service destinations in 1989
According to its 1989 charter service route map, Wardair was serving the following destinations with charter passenger flights:

 Barbados, West Indies
 Calgary, Alberta, Canada
 Edmonton, Alberta, Canada
 Fort Lauderdale, Florida, United States
 Fort Myers, Florida, United States
 Frankfurt, Germany
 Honolulu, Hawaii, United States
 Los Angeles, California, United States
 Montreal, Quebec, Canada - Dorval Airport and Mirabel Airport
 Orlando, Florida, United States
 Ottawa, Ontario, Canada
 Phoenix, Arizona, United States
 San Diego, California, United States
 San Francisco, California, United States
 Tampa, Florida, United States
 Toronto, Ontario, Canada
 Vancouver, British Columbia, Canada
 West Palm Beach, Florida, United States

Historical Fleet
3 Airbus A300B4-203 - 1986-1989
12 Airbus A310-304 - 1987-1989; 5 sold to the Canadian Forces by Canadian Airlines from 1992 and redesignated by RCAF as the CC-150 Polaris
2 Boeing 707 - 1968-1978 (includes B707-311C and B707-396C models)
1 Boeing 727-100 - 1966-1973
5 Boeing 747 - 1973-1989 (includes B747-100 and B747-200 models)
3 Bristol 170 Freighter - 1958-1977
2 de Havilland Canada DHC-2 Beaver - 1954-1968 (includes Turbine Beaver model)
5 de Havilland Canada DHC-3 Otter - 1953-1972 and 1979–1985
2 de Havilland Canada DHC-6 Twin Otter - 1970
2 de Havilland Canada DHC-7 Dash 7 - 1978-1979
2 Douglas DC-6B - 1962-1966
1 Grumman Gulfstream I
3 McDonnell Douglas DC-10-30 - 1978-1988
1 Supermarine Stranraer

Fleet in 1970

See also 
 List of defunct airlines of Canada

References

External links

Canada Transportation Authority ruling on 1989 acquisition
Wardair

Defunct airlines of Canada
Air Canada
Airlines established in 1952
Airlines disestablished in 1989
1952 establishments in Alberta
1989 disestablishments in Alberta
Defunct seaplane operators
Canadian companies disestablished in 1989
Canadian companies established in 1952